Marina San José Cuesta (born 16 September 1983) is a Spanish actress. Mostly dedicated to theatre, she has also ventured into television and cinema, including her performance in the historical soap opera Amar en tiempos revueltos.

Biography 
Born in Madrid on 16 September 1983, she is the daughter of Ana Belén and Víctor Manuel. She played a minor role in the 1999 film Entre las piernas. She trained as an actress at the Laboratorio William Layton in Madrid. In 2005, she participated as choir singer under the alias 'Xana' in her parents' tour Una canción me trajo aquí.

Mainly dedicated to theatre, she had her debut with the stage play El cartero de Neruda in 2005. She has since starred in many stage plays including Móvil, Hermanas, Mathilde, ¡Sin paga, nadie paga!, 3 hermanas, El test, and Escape Room.

She earned recognition for her role as 'Ana Silva' in Amar en tiempos revueltos, playing along Carlota Olcina the iconic lesbian couple formed by Ana and Teresa. San José also starred in the lesbian-related comedy film De chica en chica, released in 2015.
In 2017, San José participated in the competitive cooking show MasterChef Celebrity.

She performed the character 'Ángeles Acosta' in the series 45 revoluciones (45 rpm''), aired on Antena 3 in 2019.

Filmography 

Television

Film

Awards and nominations

References 

1983 births
Spanish stage actresses
Spanish television actresses
Spanish film actresses
21st-century Spanish actresses
Actresses from Madrid
Living people